Phoenicus or Phoinikous, also known as Phoenice or Phoinike (Φοινίκη), was a port of ancient Lycia, a little to the east of Patara; it was scarcely  distant from the latter place, and surrounded on all sides by high cliffs. In the war against Antiochus III the Great, a Roman fleet took its station there with a view of taking Patara.

Its site is located near the modern Kalkan.

References

Populated places in ancient Lycia
Former populated places in Turkey